Red Rock Center for the Arts is a historic structure located at 222 East Blue Earth Avenue, in Fairmont, Minnesota, United States. It was added to the National Register of Historic Places on May 18, 1988 as the First Church of Christ, Scientist. It is now owned by Martin County, which leases it to the Martin County Preservation Association.

First Church of Christ, Scientist, Fairmont, was organized October 1, 1891, and the church edifice,  designed by noted Minnesota architect, Harry Wild Jones was completed in 1898. Sioux quartzite blocks quarried in Minnesota were used for the walls. The massive blocks are called red rocks because of their color and this gave rise to the present name of the building.

In 1937, First Church sold the building to the Christian Church of Fairmont which sold it in 1988 to a businessman.

First Church of Christ, Scientist, Fairmont, had another church building built at 205 Albion Avenue (between Tilden and Forest streets), which was designed by noted Chicago architect, Charles Draper Faulkner in the Colonial Revival style. That building is now the Lakeview Funeral Home.

First Church of Christ, Scientist, Fairmont, is no longer in existence.

Preservation
The American Association for State and Local History (AASLH) selected the Martin County Preservation Association as one of its 2007 AASLH Award of Merit Winners, for work to preserve, restore and reuse this historic building.

See also
List of former Christian Science churches, societies and buildings
National Register of Historic Places listings in Martin County, Minnesota

References

External links

Red Rock Center for the Arts
2007 Award
Local Historic sites
Martin County Genealogical Society

19th-century Christian Science church buildings
Buildings and structures in Martin County, Minnesota
Churches on the National Register of Historic Places in Minnesota
Churches completed in 1898
Former Christian Science churches, societies and buildings in Minnesota
Romanesque Revival church buildings in Minnesota
National Register of Historic Places in Martin County, Minnesota
1898 establishments in Minnesota